Piedmont Henry Hospital is a 215-bed not-for-profit, community-based hospital located in Stockbridge, Georgia. In August 2011, the community hospital's executive Board agreed to affiliate with Piedmont Healthcare.

Certification
The hospital is accredited by DNV-GL and is ISO:9001-2015 certified.
The hospital's laboratory is certified by Joint Commission.

History
Henry Medical Center was founded on July 9, 1979 as Henry General Hospital with 104 beds.

In 1995, the hospital renamed itself Henry Medical Center.

In 2011, the hospital became Piedmont Henry Hospital after affiliation with Piedmont Healthcare.

Expansion
In 2006, Henry Medical Center completed its North Tower, expanding its operations to include 215 beds.

In July 2010, Henry Medical Center opened the Henry Radiation Oncology Center in a joint venture with Radiation Oncology Services.

In 2018, Piedmont Henry Hospital became a 236-bed facility.

References

External links
Official website
Hospital-Data.com

Hospital buildings completed in 1979
Hospital buildings completed in 2006
Hospitals in Georgia (U.S. state)
Buildings and structures in Henry County, Georgia